Barneveld is a municipality in the province of Gelderland in the center of the Netherlands. It is known for its poultry industry and large Protestant community.

Barneveld is estimated to be over 800 years old. This estimation is based on a text from 1174 in which a Wolfram van Barneveld is named.

Population centres 
Barneveld (town)
De Glind
Garderen
Kootwijk
Kootwijkerbroek
Stroe
Terschuur
Voorthuizen
Zwartebroek

Notable people 
 Jan van Schaffelaar (ca.1445–1482) a cavalry officer in the duchy of Guelders 
 Hendrik Jansen van Barrefelt (ca.1520–ca.1594) a weaver, a Christian mystic and author
 Jan Everts Bout (1601/1602 – 1671) an early Dutch settler in the New Netherland
 Jacobus Kapteyn FRS FRSE LLD (1851–1922) a Dutch astronomer
 Eduard Daniël van Oort (1876–1933) a Dutch ornithologist 
 Simeon Gottfried Albert Doorenbos (1891–1980) a Dutch horticulturist, Director of The Hague Parks Department 1927/1957
 Chris van Veen (1922–2009) a Dutch politician and trade association executive
 Hans Van de Bovenkamp (born 1938 in Garderen) a Dutch-born American sculptor

Sport 
 Conny van Bentum (born 1965) a female former butterfly and freestyle swimmer, three time Olympic relay team medallist
 Alfred Schreuder (born 1972) a Dutch football manager and former player with over 350 club caps
 Johan Jansen (born 1989) a Dutch professional football goalkeeper, 226 club caps with GVVV

Gallery

References

External links 

 

 
Municipalities of Gelderland
Populated places in Gelderland